Gabriel Asaad (Syriac: ܓܒܪܐܝܠ ܐܣܥܕ) (March 18, 1907, Midyat – July 6, 1997 Stockholm) was an Assyrian composer and musician. Among the classical songs of Gabriel Asaad there are Ho Donho Shemsho (ܗܐ ܕܢܚܐ ܫܡܫܐ The sun is shining), Motho Rhimto (ܡܬܐ ܪܚܝܡܬܐ Beloved nation) and Moth Beth-Nahrin (ܡܬܝ ܒܝܬܢܗܪܝܢ Mesopotamia my nation). Gabriel Asaad was the pioneer of Assyrian music and composed the first Assyrian song in the Turoyo language in modern time, Othuroye Ho Mtoth Elfan l-Metba‘ (1926, ܐܬܘܪܝܶܐ ܗܐ ܡܛܬ ܐܠܦܢ ܠܡܛܒܥ Assyrians, Our ship is on the way to sink).

See also
List of Assyrian musicians

References 
الموسيقار السرياني كبرئيل أسعد

External links
Gabriel Asaad, Qeenatha.com

، عبود زيتون
الموسيقار الملفان كبرئيل أسعد , كريم إينا

Turkish emigrants to Sweden
Assyrian nationalists
Assyrian musicians
Assyrians from the Ottoman Empire
1997 deaths
Syriac-language singers
1907 births
Swedish people of Assyrian/Syriac descent
20th-century Syrian male singers
20th-century composers